Chinna Durai is a 1952 Indian Tamil-language romantic thriller film, directed and produced by T. R. Mahalingam, and written by K. D. Santhanam. The film stars Mahalingam, S. Varalakshmi and G. Sakunthala, with V. K. Ramasamy and Chandrababu in supporting roles. It is based on the novel Irumana Mohinigal, by Vaduvoor Duraisamy Ayyengar. The film was released on 22 August 1952 and failed at the box office.

Plot

Cast 
 T. R. Mahalingam as Raja Bahadur and Chinna Durai
 S. Varalakshmi as Indramani
G. Sakunthala as Chandramani
 V. K. Ramasamy as Raja Sri Krishnan
 Chandrababu as the secretary

Production 
Chinna Durai is based on the novel Irumana Mohinigal, by Vaduvoor Duraisamy Ayyengar. T. R. Mahalingam, in addition to directing and producing, also played in dual roles.

Soundtrack 
The music was composed by T. G. Lingappa and the lyrics were penned by K. D. Santhanam.

Release and reception 
Chinna Durai was released on 22 August 2022, and distributed by MS Pictures. According to historian Randor Guy, the film failed commercially due to Mahalingam's poor directorial skills.

References

External links 
 

1950s romantic thriller films
1950s Tamil-language films
1952 films
Films based on Indian novels
Films scored by T. G. Lingappa
Indian black-and-white films
Indian romantic thriller films